Archenor or Acheinor was in Greek mythology one of the Niobids, and perhaps the same who is called by Ovid "Alphenor".

The names of the Niobids, however, differ very much in the different lists.

In commercial telegraph code, the word "Archenor" was used to signify "You must number your invoices".

Notes

References 

 Gaius Julius Hyginus, Fabulae from The Myths of Hyginus translated and edited by Mary Grant. University of Kansas Publications in Humanistic Studies. Online version at the Topos Text Project.
 Publius Ovidius Naso, Metamorphoses translated by Brookes More (1859-1942). Boston, Cornhill Publishing Co. 1922. Online version at the Perseus Digital Library.
 Publius Ovidius Naso, Metamorphoses. Hugo Magnus. Gotha (Germany). Friedr. Andr. Perthes. 1892. Latin text available at the Perseus Digital Library.

Niobids

Characters in Greek mythology